The Air Force Forces Command, previously the Air Fleet Command from 1970 to 2001, was a high command authority of the German Air Force of the Bundeswehr, responsible for the operations of the Air Force. In 2013, it was disbanded after its functions were merged into the new Air Force Command (Kommando Luftwaffe), along with those of the other high command bodies of the German Air Force.

Its subordinate elements were:
 Air Force Operations Command
 German Joint Force Air Component Command Headquarters (JFAC HQ)
 National Air Defense Command Center
 German Space Situational Awareness Center
 Air Force Support Command
1st Air Division in Southern Germany
2nd Air Division in Eastern Germany
4th Air Division in Western Germany
Air Command and Control Section 1
Air Command and Control Section 3
Air Command and Control Section 2
Surface-to-Air Missile Wing 5
 SAM Battalion 22
SAM Battalion 23
Surface-to-Air Missile Wing 2
 SAM Battalion 21
 SAM Battalion 24
Surface-to-Air Missile Wing 1
 SAM Battalion 25
 SAM Battalion 26
 Air Transport Wing 61 (disbanded 31 December 2017)
 Air Transport Wing 62
 Air Transport Wing 63
 Helicopter Wing 64
 Ministry of Defence Transport Wing
 Fighter-Bomber Wing 31 “Boelcke”
 Fighter-Bomber Wing 33
 Fighter Wing 73 "Steinhoff"
 Fighter Wing 74
 Reconnaissance Wing 51 "Immelmann"
German Air Force Tactical Training Center Italy
Air Force Regiment "Friesland"

References 

Air force commands of Germany
Military units and formations disestablished in 2013
Units and formations of the German Air Force
Military units and formations established in 1970